The United Kingdom has submitted films for consideration for the Academy Award for Best International Feature Film irregularly since 1991. The award is handed out annually by the United States Academy of Motion Picture Arts and Sciences to a feature-length motion picture produced outside the United States that contains primarily non-English dialogue. The UK has one of the world's most visible film industries and British films, as well as British actors, actresses and behind-the-scenes crew members have been prominently featured amongst Oscar nominees since the 1930s. Most British features are not eligible for the Best Foreign Language Film, because they are produced in English.

, the United Kingdom has submitted eighteen films for Oscar consideration, with two of them getting Oscar nominations. Most of these films were made by directors from or based in Wales, and were partially or completely filmed in the Welsh language.

The British nominee is selected by the British Academy of Film and Television Arts (BAFTA).

Submissions
The Academy of Motion Picture Arts and Sciences has invited the film industries of various countries to submit their best film for the Academy Award for Best Foreign Language Film since 1956. The Foreign Language Film Award Committee oversees the process and reviews all the submitted films. Following this, they vote via secret ballot to determine the five nominees for the award. Below is a list of the films that have been submitted by the United Kingdom for review by the Academy for the award by year and the respective Academy Awards ceremony.

Notes

 In 2002, BAFTA originally selected the Hindi language The Warrior as its Oscar submission but the film was controversially disqualified by AMPAS because the film did not take place in, nor was it filmed in a language indigenous to, the United Kingdom. The rule was changed in 2005, and the first film to benefit was a Hindi-language film from Canada.
 In 2007, BAFTA invited British filmmakers to submit films for consideration to represent the UK in the category. Two films responded to the call: Calon Gaeth, in Welsh and Seachd: The Inaccessible Pinnacle, one of the first films made in Scots Gaelic. For unknown reasons, BAFTA declined to submit either film. The ensuing controversy led to widespread coverage in the international press and producer Christopher Young resigning his membership of BAFTA. The matter was also raised in the Scottish Parliament and BAFTA was asked to reconsider its decision, to no avail.

See also
List of Academy Award winners and nominees for Best Foreign Language Film
List of Academy Award-winning foreign language films
British Cinema
List of Irish submissions for the Academy Award for Best International Feature Film

Notes

References

External links
The Official Academy Awards Database
The Motion Picture Credits Database
IMDb Academy Awards Page

United Kingdom
Academy Award